is a former Japanese professional baseball player.

External links

1963 births
Living people
Baseball people from Chiba Prefecture
People from Funabashi
Japanese baseball players
Nippon Professional Baseball infielders
Yomiuri Giants players
Orix BlueWave players
Kintetsu Buffaloes players
Osaka Kintetsu Buffaloes players
Japanese baseball coaches
Nippon Professional Baseball coaches